XHGI-FM is a radio station on 97.3 FM in Zacatipan, San Luis Potosí, serving Tamazunchale. It is known as Radio Reyna.

History
XEGI-AM 1160 received its concession on July 11, 1988. It was owned by Aurora Cárdenas Toral and broadcast as a 500-watt daytimer. Her successors sold XEGI to Luis Antonio Río Castañeda and Luis Antonio, Ernesto, Ricardo and Elisa Ríos Cárdenas. They promptly turned XEGI over to Juan Roberto Reyna López in 2006. Upon his death the next year, Juan Roberto Reyna Irazabal became the concessionaire along with Esteban Javier and Sergio Manuel Reyna Irazabal, Sonia Reyna López and Elsa Irazabal McMillan. These relatives later consolidated the station under a corporation.

XEGI received approval to migrate to FM in November 2010.

References

Radio stations in San Luis Potosí